Jeff King (born February 6, 1956) is an American musher and sled dog racer.

King moved to Alaska in 1975 and began racing in 1976. A successful sled dog racer, he won the Yukon Quest in 1989, and the Iditarod Trail Sled Dog Race in 1993, 1996, 1998, and, most recently, the 2006 Iditarod. Four other mushers have won the Iditarod four times (Martin Buser, Susan Butcher, Doug Swingley, Lance Mackey) and only two, Dallas Seavey and Rick Swenson, have won it more often (five times each). King was 50 years old when he won the 2006 Iditarod, which made him the oldest musher to win the event, a distinction he held until 2017, when Mitch Seavey won at age 57. As of 2015, King has competed in 26 Iditarods. His "Idita-Rider" for the 2005 Iditarod was a child sponsored by the Make-a-Wish Foundation. King has also won many other sled dog races. He continues to race and has a kennel near the entrance of Denali National Park.

While on a training run in Denali National Park in 1980, King's team became entangled with that of a new volunteer ranger and met his future wife and mother of his three daughters, award-winning artist Donna Gates.  They divorced in 2011.

Jeff King was inducted into the Iditarod Hall of Fame in 1999. He is the author of Cold Hands, Warm Heart: Alaskan Adventures of an Iditarod Champion, and co-author (with Tricia Brown) of a children's book, Zig: The Princess Warrior.

Major Mushing Victories
Iditarod (4 times): 1993, 1996, 1998, 2006

Yukon Quest: 1989

Kuskokwim 300 (9): 1991, 1992, 1993, 1997, 2001, 2002, 2003, 2006 and 2013

Copper Basin 300 (2): 1995, 2010

Tustumena 200 (3): 2000

Notes

References 
 St. George, Chas. (March 15, 2006). King makes it number four. Iditarod Trail Sled Dog Race. Anchorage, Alaska. Retrieved on March 15, 2006 from Official Site of the Iditarod, For Press (pdf of press release).
 Medred,Craig & Caldwell, Suzanna (March 13, 2013). Mitch Seavey claims victory in Iditarod 2013. "Alaska Dispatch"

External links
 

1956 births
Dog mushers from Alaska
Living people
People from Denali Borough, Alaska
People from Madera County, California
Iditarod champions